Billy Singleton (born June 1, 1968, in New York City) is a former professional basketball player, most notable for his career in the British Basketball League. Singleton is the 4th leading scorer in British basketball history & 5th leading rebounder in British basketball history, 3rd in field goal percentage in British basketball history. 
Billy is the product of a true basketball family and credits his basketball achievement to his two older sisters & his uncle. 
- Lorna Singleton (L.I.U. women's Basketball 1981-1985 Hall of Fame) 
- Carla Singleton (1983-1987 Northeastern University Hall of Fame)
-Ed Pinckney (1981-1985 Villanova University, National Champions, NBA, Chicago Bulls Assistant Coach)

The forward most recently played for the Chester Jets, where he occupied the role of top assistant coach for 1 season, head coach for 2 seasons.

In 2007, Singleton accepted the offer to become Director of Basketball Operations at his former college, St. John's of the Big East Conference.

In 2014 he became the Lead Assistant for Men's Basketball at Nyack College and has entered his third season as an associate coach in 2017.

Career

1987-1988:  St. John's (NCAA)
1988-1989:  St. John's (NCAA)
1989-1990:  St. John's (NCAA)
1990-1991:  St. John's (NCAA)
1991-1991:  Queens Annadale
1992-1993:  Birmingham Bullets
1993-1994:  AEL Limassol
 1994                 National De Ingenieros/ Honduras
1994-1995:  Maccabi Naharya
1995                Santiago Chile 
 1995-1996:  Chester Jets
1996-1997:  Chester Jets
1997-1998:  Leicester Riders
1998-1999:  Leicester Riders
1999-2000:  Thames Valley Tigers
 2000                 Dandenong Rangers Australia 
2000-2001:  Leicester Riders
2001-2002:  Leicester Riders
2002-2003:  Scottish Rocks
(in May, 2003, signed 1-game contract with Vichy Auvergne)
2003-2004:  Chester Jets
2004-2005:  Chester Jets
2005-2006:  Chester Jets (Player/Coach)
2006-2007:  Chester Jets {Player/Coach}

Awards and achievements

New York City Player of the year 1987 Iron Horse Award Winner
All-City, All-State, All-American 1987
1991 Captain of St. John's University Basketball Team (Elight 8)
AAU Junior Olympic National Championship Team,(Gauchos) 1987
Big East All-Star Team, 1990
English All-Star Game, 1993, 1997 1998 and 1999
English League All-Star Team, 1997
 Player Of The Year Honduras 1994
Israeli League Newcomer of the Year, 1995
BBL Champion, 2001 and 2003
National Cup Winner, 2000–2001
National Cup Runner-up, 1997–1998
BBL Trophy Winner, 2003–2004
BBL Trophy Runner-up, 1996–1997
BBL Championship Winner, 2004–2005
Play-off Runner-up, 2003–2004 and 2004–2005
Play-off Winner, 2000–2001 and 2002–2003

References

1968 births
Living people
American expatriate basketball people in Chile
American expatriate basketball people in Cyprus
American expatriate basketball people in France
American expatriate basketball people in Honduras
American expatriate basketball people in Ireland
American expatriate basketball people in Israel
American expatriate basketball people in the United Kingdom
American men's basketball players
British men's basketball players
Cheshire Jets players
Glasgow Rocks players
JA Vichy players
Leicester Riders players
Basketball players from New York City
St. John's Red Storm men's basketball players
Centers (basketball)
American expatriate sportspeople in England
American expatriate sportspeople in Scotland